Dr.Challoners may refer to one of the following schools:
Dr Challoner's Grammar School – for boys with a co-educational Sixth Form
Dr Challoner's High School – for girls